Pitiful may refer to:

 "Mr. Pitiful" (song)
 "Pitiful" (Rose Marie McCoy/Charlie Singleton song), sung by Aretha Franklin on the album Soul '69
 "Pitiful" (Sick Puppies song)
 "Poor Poor Pitiful Me" (song)
 "You're Pitiful" (song)